The 1958–59 WHL season was the seventh season of the Western Hockey League. The Seattle Totems were the President's Cup champions as they beat the Calgary Stampeders in four games in the final series. 

The Spokane Spokes joined as an expansion club. Initially named the "Flyers" they were forced to modify their name after complaints from the Edmonton Flyers, who cited seniority. The Seattle franchise also changed names, going from the "Americans" to the "Totems". The teams played an unbalanced schedule: the Cost Division teams played 70 games each, while the Prairie Division teams had 64 each.

Guyle Fielder set a league record with 95 assists, winning the scoring title with 119 points. He was named the Coast Division's most valuable player, while Ed Dorohoy of the Calgary Stampeders, who scored 109 points, was named so for the Prairie Division.

Final standings 

bold - qualified for playoffs

Playoffs 

The Seattle Totems defeated the Calgary Stampeders 4 games to 0 to win the President's Cup.

References

Bibliography

 

Western Hockey League (1952–1974) seasons
1958–59 in American ice hockey by league
1958–59 in Canadian ice hockey by league